Thomas Schlieter (born 28 January 1981 in Duisburg, Germany) is a German footballer playing for BV Osterfeld.

Career 
He made his debut on the professional league level in the 2. Bundesliga for Rot-Weiß Oberhausen on 24 August 2008, when he started a game against FC Ingolstadt 04.

He then played for Wuppertaler SV, VfB Homberg and VfB Homberg II, after which he took a career break, before returning in the field for BV Osterfeld.

References

1981 births
Living people
German footballers
Rot-Weiß Oberhausen players
Wuppertaler SV players
Footballers from Duisburg
SSVg Velbert players
2. Bundesliga players
Association football defenders
VfB Homberg players